James Joseph Croce (January 10, 1943 – September 20, 1973) was an American folk and rock singer-songwriter. Between 1966 and 1973, he released five studio albums and numerous singles. During this period, Croce took a series of odd jobs to pay bills while he continued to write, record, and perform concerts. After Croce formed a partnership with songwriter and guitarist Maury Muehleisen, his fortunes turned in the early 1970s. Croce's breakthrough came in 1972; his third album, You Don't Mess Around with Jim, produced three charting singles, including "Time in a Bottle", which reached No. 1 after Croce died. The follow-up album, Life and Times, included the song "Bad, Bad Leroy Brown", which was the only No. 1 hit he had during his lifetime.

On September 20, 1973, at the height of his popularity and the day before the lead single to his fifth album I Got a Name was released, Croce and five others died in a plane crash. His music continued to chart throughout the 1970s following his death. Croce's wife and early songwriting partner, Ingrid, continued to write and record after his death, and their son A. J. Croce became a singer-songwriter in the 1990s.

Early life
Croce was born January 10, 1943, (although some sources say 1942) in South Philadelphia, Pennsylvania, to James Albert Croce (1914–1972) and Flora Mary (Babusci) Croce (1913–2000), Italian Americans whose parents had immigrated from Trasacco and Balsorano in Abruzzo and Palermo in Sicily.

Croce grew up in Upper Darby, Pennsylvania, right outside of Philadelphia, and attended Upper Darby High School. Graduating in 1960, he studied at Malvern Preparatory School for a year before enrolling at Villanova University, majoring in psychology and minoring in German. Croce received a Bachelor of Science in Social Studies degree in 1965. He was a member of the Villanova Singers and the Villanova Spires. When the Spires performed off-campus or made recordings, they were known as The Coventry Lads. Croce was also a student disc jockey at WKVU, which has since become WXVU.

Career

Early career 
Croce did not take music seriously until he studied at Villanova, where he formed bands and performed at fraternity parties, coffeehouses, and universities around Philadelphia, playing "anything that the people wanted to hear: blues, rock, a cappella, railroad music ... anything." Croce's band was chosen for a foreign exchange tour of Africa, the Middle East, and Yugoslavia. He later said, "We just ate what the people ate, lived in the woods, and played our songs. Of course they didn't speak English over there but if you mean what you're singing, people understand." On November 29, 1963, Croce met his future wife, Ingrid Jacobson, at the Philadelphia Convention Hall during a hootenanny, where he was judging a contest.

Croce released his first album, Facets, in 1966, with 500 copies pressed. The album had been financed with a $500 ($ in  dollars) wedding gift from Croce's parents, who set a condition that the money must be spent to make an album. They hoped that he would give up music after the album failed, and use his college education to pursue a "respectable" profession. However, the album proved a success, with every copy sold.

1960s 
Croce married Jacobson in 1966, and converted to Judaism, as his wife was Jewish. They were married in a traditional Jewish ceremony. Croce enlisted in the Army National Guard in New Jersey that same year to avoid being drafted and deployed to Vietnam, and served on active duty for four months, leaving for duty a week after his honeymoon. Croce, who was not good with authority, had to go through basic training twice. He said he would be prepared if "there's ever a war where we have to defend ourselves with mops".

From the mid-1960s to the early 1970s, Croce performed with his wife as a duo. At first, their performances included songs by artists such as Ian & Sylvia, Gordon Lightfoot, Joan Baez, and Arlo Guthrie, but in time they began writing their own music. During this time, Croce got his first long-term gig, at a suburban bar and steakhouse in Lima, Pennsylvania, called The Riddle Paddock. His set list covered several genres, including blues, country, rock and roll, and folk.

In 1968, the Croces were encouraged by record producer Tommy West to move to New York City. The couple spent time in the Kingsbridge section of the Bronx and recorded their first album with Capitol Records.

Becoming disillusioned by the music business and New York City, they sold all but one guitar to pay the rent and returned to the Pennsylvania countryside, settling in an old farm in Lyndell, where he played for $25 a night ($ in  dollars), which was not enough money to live on. Croce was forced to take odd jobs such as driving trucks, construction work, and teaching guitar to pay the bills while continuing to write songs, often about the characters he would meet at the local bars and truck stops and his experiences at work; these provided the material for such songs as "Big Wheel" and "Workin' at the Car Wash Blues".

1970s 

The Croces returned to Philadelphia and Croce decided to be "serious" about becoming a productive member of society. "I'd worked construction crews, and I'd been a welder while I was in college. But I'd rather do other things than get burned." His determination to be "serious" led to a job at a Philadelphia R&B AM radio station, WHAT, where Croce translated commercials into "soul". "I'd sell airtime to Bronco's Poolroom and then write the spot: 'You wanna be cool, and you wanna shoot pool ... dig it.'"

In 1970, Croce met classically trained pianist-guitarist and singer-songwriter Maury Muehleisen from Trenton, New Jersey, through producer Joe Salviuolo. Salviuolo and Croce had been friends when they studied at Villanova University, and Salviuolo had met Muehleisen when he was teaching at Glassboro State College in New Jersey. Salviuolo brought Croce and Muehleisen together at the production office of Tommy West and Terry Cashman in New York City. Croce at first backed Muehleisen on guitar, but gradually their roles reversed, with Muehleisen adding a lead guitar to Croce's music.

When Jim Croce and Ingrid discovered they were going to have a child, Croce became more determined to make music his profession. He sent a cassette of his new songs to a friend and producer in New York City in the hope that he could get a record deal. When their son Adrian James (A. J.) was born in September 1971, Ingrid became a stay-at-home mom while Jim went on the road to promote his music.

In 1972, Croce signed a three-record contract with ABC Records, releasing two albums, You Don't Mess Around with Jim and Life and Times. The singles "You Don't Mess Around with Jim", "Operator (That's Not the Way It Feels)", and "Time in a Bottle" all received airplay. Also that year, the Croce family moved to San Diego, California. Croce began appearing on television, including his national debut on American Bandstand on August 12, The Tonight Show on August 14, and The Dick Cavett Show on September 20 and 21.

Croce began touring the United States with Muehleisen, performing in large coffee houses, on college campuses, and at folk festivals. However, his financial situation remained precarious. The record company had fronted him the money to record, and much of his earnings went to repay the advance. In February 1973, Croce and Muehleisen traveled to Europe, performing in London, Paris, Amsterdam, Monte Carlo, Zurich and Dublin and receiving positive reviews. Croce made television appearances on The Midnight Special, which he co-hosted on June 15, and The Helen Reddy Show on July 19. Croce's biggest single, "Bad, Bad Leroy Brown", reached No. 1 on the American charts in July.

From July 16 through August 4, Croce and Muehleisen returned to London and performed on The Old Grey Whistle Test, where they sang "Lover's Cross" and "Workin' at the Car Wash Blues" from their upcoming album I Got a Name. Croce finished recording the album just a week before his death. While on tour, Croce grew increasingly homesick and decided to take a break from music and settle with Ingrid and A. J. when his Life and Times tour ended. In a letter to Ingrid which arrived after his death, Croce told her he had decided to quit music and stick to writing short stories and movie scripts as a career and withdraw from public life.

Death 
On the night of Thursday, September 20, 1973, during Croce's Life and Times tour and the day before his ABC single "I Got a Name" was released, Croce and five others were killed when their chartered Beechcraft E18S crashed into a tree during takeoff from the Natchitoches Regional Airport in Natchitoches, Louisiana. Croce was 30 years old. Others killed in the crash were pilot Robert N. Elliott, Croce's bandmate Maury Muehleisen, comedian George Stevens, manager and booking agent Kenneth D. Cortese, and road manager Dennis Rast. An hour before the crash, Croce had completed a concert at Northwestern State University's Prather Coliseum in Natchitoches; he was flying to Sherman, Texas, for a concert at Austin College.

An investigation by the National Transportation Safety Board (NTSB) named the probable cause as the pilot's failure to see the obstruction due to physical impairment and because fog reduced his vision. The 57-year-old Elliott suffered from severe coronary artery disease and had run three miles to the airport from a motel. He had an ATP certificate, 14,290 hours total flight time, and 2,190 hours in the Beech 18 type airplane. A later investigation placed the sole blame on pilot error because of his downwind takeoff into a "black hole" of severe darkness, limiting his use of visual references.

Croce was buried at Haym Salomon Memorial Park in Frazer, Pennsylvania.

Legacy 
The album I Got a Name was released on December 1, 1973. The posthumous release included three hits: "Workin' at the Car Wash Blues", "I'll Have to Say I Love You in a Song", and the title song, which had been used as the theme to the film The Last American Hero, which was released two months prior to his death. The album reached No. 2, and "I'll Have to Say I Love You in a Song" reached No. 9 on the singles chart.

While ABC had not originally released the song "Time in a Bottle" as a single, Croce's untimely death gave its lyrics, dealing with mortality and the wish to have more time, an additional resonance. The song subsequently received a large amount of airplay as an album track, and demand for a single release built. When it was eventually issued as a 7", it became his second and final No. 1 hit. After the single had finished its two-week run at the top in early January 1974, the album You Don't Mess Around with Jim became No. 1 for five weeks.

A greatest hits album entitled Photographs & Memories was released in 1974. Later posthumous releases have included Home Recordings: Americana, The Faces I've Been, Jim Croce: Classic Hits, Down the Highway, and DVD and CD releases of Croce's television performances, Have You Heard: Jim Croce Live. In 1990, Croce was inducted into the Songwriters Hall of Fame.

Queen's 1974 album Sheer Heart Attack included the song "Bring Back That Leroy Brown", whose title and lyrics reference Croce's "Bad, Bad Leroy Brown".

In 2012, Ingrid Croce published a memoir about Croce entitled I Got a Name: The Jim Croce Story.

In 1985, Ingrid Croce opened Croce's Restaurant & Jazz Bar, a project she and Jim had jokingly discussed over a decade earlier, in the historic Gaslamp Quarter in downtown San Diego. She owned and managed it until it closed on December 31, 2013. In December 2013, she opened Croce's Park West on 5th Avenue in the Bankers Hill neighborhood near Balboa Park. She closed this restaurant in January 2016.

In 2022, a Pennsylvania Historical Marker honoring Croce was installed outside his farmhouse in Lyndell.

Discography 

 Studio albums
 Facets (1966)
 Jim & Ingrid Croce (1969)
 You Don't Mess Around with Jim (1972)
 Life and Times (1973)
 I Got a Name (1973)

References

External links 
 
 Jim Croce at Songwriters Hall of Fame
 
 
 

1943 births
1973 deaths
Accidental deaths in Louisiana
American male singer-songwriters
American rock singers
American rock songwriters
American soft rock musicians
Victims of aviation accidents or incidents in the United States
Accidents and incidents involving the Beechcraft Model 18
Villanova University alumni
Capitol Records artists
ABC Records artists
American folk rock musicians
American people of Italian descent
Burials in Pennsylvania
Converts to Judaism from Roman Catholicism
United States Army soldiers
American rock guitarists
American pop guitarists
American folk guitarists
American folk singers
Jewish American songwriters
EMI Records artists
Atlantic Records artists
American pop rock singers
20th-century American singers
Rhythm guitarists
American acoustic guitarists
American male guitarists
Converts to Judaism
Jewish rock musicians
Malvern Preparatory School alumni
Singer-songwriters from Pennsylvania
People from L'Aquila
People of Abruzzese descent
People of Sicilian descent
Jewish folk singers
20th-century American guitarists
Guitarists from Philadelphia
20th-century American male singers
People from Malvern, Pennsylvania
Victims of aviation accidents or incidents in 1973
Musicians killed in aviation accidents or incidents
20th-century American Jews